Leslie Norman Reifer (born 1 December 1958) is a Barbadian former cricketer. His son Leslie Reifer is a cricket umpire.

Playing career
Reifer represented Barbados between 1977 and 1988.

References

1958 births
Barbadian cricketers
Barbados cricketers
Living people
People from Saint George, Barbados